This article is about the particular significance of the year 1855 to Wales and its people.

Incumbents

Lord Lieutenant of Anglesey – Henry Paget, 2nd Marquess of Anglesey 
Lord Lieutenant of Brecknockshire – John Lloyd Vaughan Watkins
Lord Lieutenant of Caernarvonshire – Sir Richard Williams-Bulkeley, 10th Baronet 
Lord Lieutenant of Cardiganshire – Thomas Lloyd, Coedmore 
Lord Lieutenant of Carmarthenshire – John Campbell, 1st Earl Cawdor 
Lord Lieutenant of Denbighshire – Robert Myddelton Biddulph   
Lord Lieutenant of Flintshire – Sir Stephen Glynne, 9th Baronet
Lord Lieutenant of Glamorgan – Christopher Rice Mansel Talbot
Lord Lieutenant of Merionethshire – Robert Davies Pryce 
Lord Lieutenant of Monmouthshire – Capel Hanbury Leigh
Lord Lieutenant of Montgomeryshire – Charles Hanbury-Tracy, 1st Baron Sudeley
Lord Lieutenant of Pembrokeshire – Sir John Owen, 1st Baronet
Lord Lieutenant of Radnorshire – John Walsh, 1st Baron Ormathwaite

Bishop of Bangor – Christopher Bethell 
Bishop of Llandaff – Alfred Ollivant 
Bishop of St Asaph – Thomas Vowler Short 
Bishop of St Davids – Connop Thirlwall

Events
25 February – The steamship Morna is wrecked off North Bishop Rock, with the loss of 21 lives.
30 March – The Severn ferry from Chepstow sinks, and seven people drown.
Construction of the first section of the Llanidloes and Newtown Railway begins.

Arts and literature

New books
John Jones (Talhaiarn) – Gwaith Talhaiarn, vol. 1
William Rees (Gwilym Hiraethog) – Gweithiau Barddonol Gwilym Hiraethog
William Williams (Creuddynfab) – Y Barddoniadur

Music
Death of James Green of Bron y Garth, last of the traditional crwth players.

Births
11 February – Samuel Goldsworthy, Wales international rugby player (died 1889)
9 April – Jeremiah Jones, poet (died 1902)
16 August – William David Phillips, Wales international rugby player (died 1918)
11 December – David Thomas Ffrangcon Davies, singer (died 1918)

Deaths
21 January – Evan Evans (Ieuan Glan Geirionydd), poet, 59
22 January – Sir Thomas Frankland Lewis, politician, 74
9 February – William Chambers, industrialist, 81
28 June – FitzRoy Somerset, 1st Baron Raglan, 66
probable
Richard Jones, printer and publisher, ?68
William Edwards (Gwilym Callestr), poet

References

 
Wales